Calvoa is a genus of flowering plants belonging to the family Melastomataceae.

Its native range is Africa.

Species:

Calvoa angolensis 
Calvoa confertifolia 
Calvoa crassinoda 
Calvoa grandifolia 
Calvoa hirsuta 
Calvoa integrifolia 
Calvoa jacques-felixii 
Calvoa leonardii 
Calvoa maculata 
Calvoa monticola 
Calvoa orientalis 
Calvoa pulcherrima 
Calvoa sapinii 
Calvoa seretii 
Calvoa sinuata 
Calvoa sitaeana 
Calvoa stenophylla 
Calvoa subquinquenervia 
Calvoa trochainii 
Calvoa zenkeri

References

Melastomataceae
Melastomataceae genera